Cathorops agassizii is a species of sea catfish in the family Ariidae. It was described by Carl H. and Rosa Smith Eigenmann in 1888, originally under the genus Tachisurus. It is a tropical freshwater fish which is known from Guyana and Brazil.

References

Ariidae
Fish described in 1888
Taxa named by Rosa Smith Eigenmann
Taxa named by Carl H. Eigenmann